Cheirodon is a genus of characins occurring in South America.  Of the 10 currently described species; one, C. jaguaribensis, is placed here as a convenience, as its actual position in Characidae is unknown.

Species 
 Cheirodon australe C. H. Eigenmann, 1928
 Cheirodon galusdae C. H. Eigenmann, 1928
 Cheirodon ibicuhiensis C. H. Eigenmann, 1915
 Cheirodon interruptus (Jenyns, 1842) (Uruguay tetra)
 Cheirodon jaguaribensis Fowler, 1941 - species incertae sedis
 Cheirodon kiliani Campos, 1982
 Cheirodon luelingi Géry, 1964
 Cheirodon ortegai Vari & Géry, 1980
 Cheirodon parahybae C. H. Eigenmann, 1915
 Cheirodon pisciculus Girard, 1855

References 
 

 
Characidae
Fish of South America
Taxa named by Charles Frédéric Girard
Taxonomy articles created by Polbot
Ray-finned fish genera